King's Highway18, commonly referred to as Highway18, was a provincially maintained highway in the Canadian province of Ontario, located entirely within Essex County. Since 1998, the majority of the former route has been known as Essex County Road20. The route travelled at the southernmost point in Canada, along or near the shoreline of the Detroit River and Lake Erie between Windsor and Leamington, with Highway 3 as the terminus at both ends. The former route provides access to the communities of LaSalle, Amherstburg, Malden Centre, Harrow, Kingsville and Union.

The original alignment of Highway18 followed a completely different routing for the first 18months of its existence than it would for the following 50years. As it was first designated in 1930, Highway18 provided a shortcut between Windsor and Tilbury. By early 1932, this route was renumbered as Highway 2, and a new highway between Windsor and Leamington via Amherstburg designated as Highway18. Expansion of the highway to four lanes between Windsor and Amherstburg was first proposed in the mid-1960s, but not undertaken until the mid-1980s. In the mid-1990s, the route was determined to no longer be of provincial significance and was transferred—or downloaded—to the municipalities and township that it lay within. On April1, 1997, Highway18 was downloaded through LaSalle, as well between Union and Leamington; it was temporarily rerouted to end at Highway3 in Ruthven. On January1, 1998, the entire route was transferred to Essex County.

Route description 

Highway18 was an  route that travelled along or near the shoreline of the Detroit River and Lake Erie between Windsor and Leamington in Southwestern Ontario. In addition to its provincial designation, it also carried the Heritage Highway designation for its entire length, the African-Canadian Heritage Tour from Windsor south to Essex County Road10 (Middle Side Road), and the Great Sauk Trail between Windsor and Amherstburg. Today it is mostly known as Essex County Road20; it is four-lanes from Windsor to Amherstburg, and generally two lanes for the remainder of its routing.

As it existed prior to 1997, Highway18 was maintained by the Ministry of Transportation (MTO) outside of the city of Windsor; the city was responsible for the portion within its boundaries, which the route encounters at Morton Drive. In addition, portions of the route through Amherstburg, Harrow, Kingsville and Leamington were maintained under Connecting Link agreements.
It began at Huron Church Road in Windsor and followed the E.C. Row Expressway west. The expressway ended as it curved south at Ojibway Parkway, with Highway18 taking on that name thereafter. Ojibway Parkway, a divided four lane limited-access road, ends at the Windsor city limits at Morton Drive. The former route follows Front Road into the town of LaSalle, where it shifts west and crosses Turkey Creek. Front Road travels near the shoreline of the Detroit River through LaSalle, with riverfront properties lining the western side of the road. Across the river are the southern suburbs of Detroit, Michigan.

South of LaSalle, the former route of Highway18 enters the city of Amherstburg at Essex County Road3 (Malden Road). It makes several sweeping curves and crosses the mouth of the River Canard, which is the southernmost river in Canada. After passing through the centre of Amherstburg, where Highway18 was maintained under a Connecting Link agreement between Brunner Avenue and Lowes Side Road, the route follows the shores of the Detroit River once more before curving east inland. It crosses Big Creek twice, with Knapps Island lying in the middle, before encountering the village of Malden Centre. Essex County Road50, which formed Highway 18A until 1978, loops south from Malden Centre to Colchester before meeting Highway18 again on the west side of Kingsville.

Now several kilometres inland from Lake Erie, the former route of Highway18 travels through farmland, making a brief jog south before returning to a straight eastward route into the municipality of Essex and the community of Harrow. Within Harrow, the former route is named King Street, and was maintained under a Connecting Link agreement between Roseborough Road and Herdman Street. Continuing east, it passes Cedar Creek Conservation Area and crosses Cedar Creek at Essex County Road23 (Arner Townline), which serves as the boundary between Essex and Kingsville. Entering the urban boundary of Kingsville, it meets the eastern terminus of Essex County Road50 (Heritage Road). Highway18 was maintained under a Connecting Link agreement in Kingsville between Fox Lane and the Chrysler Canada Greenway, a rail trail along a former branch of the Chesapeake and Ohio Railway.

East of Kingsville, the former route of Highway18 travels parallel to and north of Lake Erie, providing access to lakeside properties. At the hamlet of Union, Highway18 turned north to end at Highway3 in Ruthven. However, this routing was only in place between April and December 1997. Prior to then, it entered Leamington at Albuna Townline, travelling along Seacliff Drive West to Erie Street, where it turned north. The highway ended at the intersection of Talbot Street (Highway3) and Erie Street in downtown Leamington, from which Highway77 continued north to Comber. The portion of the route from Forest Avenue and Seacliff Drive to Talbot Street was maintained under a Connecting Link agreement.

History

Windsor–Tilbury 
The original alignment of Highway18 followed a completely different routing for the first 18months of its existence than it would for the following 50years. As it was first designated in 1930, Highway18 provided a shortcut between Windsor and Tilbury. In anticipation of the opening of the Ambassador Bridge, as well as the nearby Detroit–Windsor tunnel, Windsor and the surrounding townships sought road improvements between Windsor and Maidstone to alleviate traffic along Talbot Road and bypass or separate several level crossings of the Michigan Central Railway (MCR) beginning in early 1929. The province chose to designate a new right-of-way adjacent to and north of the MCR in July of that year, and spent the next several months constructing the cut-off (now known as Provincial Road) from Howard Avenue to north of Maidstone. By 1930, Highway2 had been rerouted to begin at the ferry docks in downtown Windsor, following Ouellette Avenue to Tecumseh Road, then east to and south along Howard Avenue; the short segment near Maidstone became Highway2A.

Meanwhile, the province set out to build a third highway into Windsor. Essex County had designated County Road19 along Cabana Road (now Division Road) and Baseline Road to Tilbury on April19, 1928, and soon thereafter the DPHO promised to take it over as a new provincial highway. Highway18 was officially designated on June11, 1930 along the route. Several changes were made to the provincial highway system in Essex County in February 1932. Since the route of Highway18 was shorter than the route of Highway2 between Windsor and Tilbury, the newly renamed Department of Highways (DHO) renumbered Highway18 as Highway2, while the old route of Highway2 became Highway2A. At the same time, the Highway18 designation was applied along a new provincial highway between Windsor and Leamington.

Windsor–Leamington 

On November17, 1931, Minister of Highways Leopold Macaulay announced that the province would take over the Front Road and Essex County Road2 between Windsor and Leamington following calls by towns in southern Essex County. This took place one month later on December16. Within Windsor, the new highway began at the intersection of Ouellette Avenue and Riverside Drive. From there it travelled west along Riverside Drive, Sandwich Street, and what is now the Ojibway Parkway.
Several sections of the new highway were paved when the province took them over. The Front Road was paved between Windsor and Amherstburg by 1924, King Street in Harrow was paved between 1910 and 1912, and Seacliff Drive between Kingsville and Leamington was paved in 1925. The remainder of the route between Amherstburg and Kingsville, outside of Harrow, was unimproved.

Along with the new Highway18 designation, which was applied in February 1932, the DHO undertook reconstruction of the unimproved portions of the route as a depression-relief project. As part of this work, several jogs were straightened and a new bridge constructed over Big Creek, bypassing the old route between Amherstburg and Malden Centre along what is now Meloche Road and Creek Road. Two sweeping curves were also built between Malden Centre and Harrow, and all unpaved sections were graded and gravel surfaced. Reconstruction of Highway18 was completed and the route fully opened to traffic by September30, 1932. Paving of the gravel sections of Highway18 began in 1934. By the end of the year, the route had been paved between Amherstburg and Malden Centre, as well as between Harrow and Kingsville. The final gap of gravel between Malden Centre and Harrow was paved in 1936, and a new  wooden bridge built over the River Canard along the right-of-way of the Sandwich, Windsor and Amherstburg Electric Railway.

The route of Highway18 through Amherstburg originally followed Sandwich Street, Richmond Street and Dalhousie Street. Narrow streets and sharp turns resulted in frequent accidents, especially at the S-curve south of Park Street. Although this problem was recognised shortly after the highway was established, work to remedy it did not begin until 1958, when construction began on the Amherstburg diversion. On July25, 1958, the DHO assumed the route of the future diversion, which was completed and opened to traffic on July28, 1959; the former route via Richmond Street and Dalhousie Street was subsequently renumbered as Highway18B.

Expansions and downloading 
When Highway18 was established, the entire route was two lanes wide. Twinning of what is today known as the Ojibway Parkway took place in the late 1930s and was one of the earliest examples of a divided highway in Ontario. The divided portion began at Sandwich Street and ended at an intersection on the north side of the Turkey Creek bridge. This section of Highway18 was known as Main Street or the Seven Mile Road until it was renamed as the Ojibway Parkway at the beginning of 1973. The remainder of the route between Amherstburg and the Turkey Creek bridge was gradually widened over the course of 25years. Beginning in June 1965, following several years of deferrals, the two lane Turkey Creek bridge was widened as part of work to expand Front Road to four lanes as far south as Gary Avenue. The new four lane bridge was opened officially on September17, 1966. That year, the Southwestern Ontario Highway Planning Study was released, which recommended numerous changes to the highway network in Essex County. Among them was four-laning Highway18 between Amherstburg and Windsor.

On September15 1970, the River Canard bridge experienced a structural failure and was taken out of service. It was replaced by a temporary bailey bridge that opened in January 1971. Planning for a replacement bridge to accommodate the widening of Highway18 to four lanes had been underway since the early 1960s. Amherstburg council requested the new bridge have a  clearance, compared with the  clearance of the old bridge. The DHO refused, insisting a  clearance would be adequate. In August 1972, after two years of discussions, the higher clearance was approved. It was opened to traffic in February 1974, and the bailey bridge subsequently disassembled.

Planning to remove the dangerous two lane Brunner Mond bridge in Amherstburg, the site of numerous accidents, was underway by the 1970s. The bridge crossed a Penn Central Railroad track midway between Texas Road and Brunner Avenue, and formed a major hurdle in the proposal to four lane Highway18 between Amherstburg and LaSalle. On March1, 1976, Minister of Transportation James Snow officially announced that the rebuilt highway would be four lanes wide. Work on the crossing began on July11, 1977 and was completed by the end of the year.

Meanwhile in Windsor, construction of the E.C. Row Expressway was underway. Built to provide a ring road around Windsor, the expressway was opened as a two lane road between Ojibway Parkway and Huron Church Road on June9, 1983. Starting with the 1982 Ontario Road Map, Highway18 is shown as following the still-unopened E.C. Row Expressway to Huron Church Road. Construction to widen the west end of the E.C. Row Expressway to four lanes began in October 1989 and was completed in September, 1990.

Fulton personally intervened to ensure that the oft-deferred project be built. Construction to widen  of the route from north of the River Canard bridge to south of the Turkey Creek bridge in LaSalle began in the spring of 1987.

As part of a series of budget cuts initiated by premier Mike Harris under his Common Sense Revolution platform in 1995, numerous highways deemed to no longer be of significance to the provincial network were decommissioned and responsibility for the routes transferred to a lower level of government, a process referred to as downloading. The  portion of the route through LaSalle was transferred to that town on the same day. Essex County Road45 (Union Avenue) was assumed in order to establish a logical eastern terminus for the route at Highway3 in Ruthven. On January1, 1998, the remainder of Highway18 was downloaded and transferred to Essex County. Since 1998, the former route of Highway18 has been known as Essex County Road20.

Suffixed routes

Highway 18A 

Highway 18A was a  route that began and ended at Highway18, travelling along the Lake Erie shoreline and through Colchester. It was the southernmost highway to ever exist in Canada, as the only one to travel south of the 42nd parallel. Highway18A was assumed as a provincial highway on April13, 1938. It was transferred to Essex County on January1, 1978, and has since been known as Essex County Road50.

Highway 18B (Ruthven) 

Highway18B was a short stub serving to connect Highway 18 with Highway 3 west of Leamington. It was assumed by the DHO on August25, 1937. While initially gravel-surfaced, the highway was paved in 1944. Highway 18B was renumbered as Highway107 in 1952. Highway18 would briefly follow this route between April 1997 and January 1998.

Highway 18B (Amherstburg) 

A second Highway18B existed through downtown Amherstburg in the 1960s, following the original route of Highway18 along Richmond Street and Dalhousie Street.

Major intersections

See also 

 Ontario Highway 98
 List of numbered roads in Essex County

References 

County roads in Essex County, Ontario
018
Leamington, Ontario